Zoomorphology is a quarterly academic journal published by Springer-Verlag Germany of Berlin, Germany. The journal has been published earlier under names Zoomorphologie, Zeitschrift für Morphologie der Tiere, and Zeitschrift für Morphologie und Ökologie der Tiere.

According to EBSCOhost, it "features original papers based on morphological investigation of invertebrates and vertebrates at the macroscopic, microscopic and ultrastructural levels, including embryological studies."

See also
 List of zoology journals

References

Zoology journals
Quarterly journals
Springer Science+Business Media academic journals